Ot Danum is a Barito language of the central Borneo, Indonesia, spoken by the Ot Danum people. Dialects include Cihie and Dohoi.

References 

West Barito languages
Languages of Indonesia